The molecular formula C10H13N (molar mass 147.219 g/mol, exact mass: 147.1048 u) may refer to:

 Actinidine
 2-Aminotetralin (2-AT or THN)
 NM-2-AI, or N-methyl-2-aminoindane

Molecular formulas